Andrey Morev (born 3 October 1973) is a Kazakhstani football goalkeeper who plays for the club FC Kyzylzhar.He also has played for the Kazakhstan national football team.

External links

Living people
1973 births
Sportspeople from Omsk
Kazakhstani footballers
Association football midfielders
Kazakhstan international footballers
FC Irtysh Omsk players
FC Zhenis Astana players
FC Tobol players
FC Kyzylzhar players
FC Aktobe players
FC Chita players